Amana anhuiensis is a Chinese plant species in the lily family,  native to Anhui Province in eastern China.

References

Liliaceae
Flora of Anhui
Plants described in 2001